Patrick John Cronin (23 September 1996 – 17 April 2016) was a 19-year-old Australian man who died following a single strike to the back of his head (described as a coward punch) while he attempted to pull his friend out of a brawl at the Windy Mile Hotel in Diamond Creek, Victoria.

It is believed the brawl involved up to thirty individuals, several of whom were charged in relation to the brawl. The main offender, Andrew William Lee, who pleaded guilty to the manslaughter of Cronin, received a prison term of eight years with a five-year non-parole period. Following his sentencing, Lee sought two attempts to appeal his original sentence but was refused. In addition to his sentence, Lee was ordered to pay Cronin's family $170,972 by the Supreme Court of Victoria following a compensation claim by Cronin's family.

Of the other individuals who were charged in relation to Cronin's death, one had his charge dismissed, two received a criminal conviction and had to pay fines of $2,000 and $3,000, two were offered diversions, and one was ordered to be of good behaviour and make a $2,000 donation to the Pat Cronin Foundation.

Since his death, Cronin's family have launched the Pat Cronin Foundation where they aim to end the coward punch and educate people on the consequences of violence. The foundation present their "Be Wise Education Program" to school students across Victoria in an effort to promote wise decision-making from a young age.

Circumstances of death 
On 16 April 2016 at 9:45p.m., Patrick Cronin met with friends at the bar of the Windy Mile Hotel in Diamond Creek, Victoria, Australia. Earlier that day, Cronin, a student footballer, had played his first senior football match for his local club, together with his older brother Lucas. Andrew Lee arrived at the hotel at 10:21p.m. and proceeded to have a few drinks with his friends.

At around 11p.m., a fight broke out just outside the hotel after a man named Joseph Hitchcock confronted a group of four patrons after they yelled "fuck off, you fatty" to him. Shortly after, Patrick Cronin was seen on CCTV to have left his seat at the bar and proceeded outside to where the fight was taking place. He was seen trying to remove his friend, Anthony Hopkins, from the brawl. Lee also proceeded outside to where the fight was taking place and stood there and observed for around a minute prior to becoming involved. 

Lee approached the brawl out of Cronin's view towards his right side. He became involved in the brawl when he threw three punches, all of which were aimed at Cronin's friend, Hopkins. The first punch struck with the right side of Hopkins' head, the second punch struck Cronin near his ear with the force causing Cronin to stumble sideways, and the third punch did not appear to strike anyone. From that point, Lee continued his involvement in the brawl while Cronin removed Hopkins and other friends out of the area.

Police arrived at the hotel soon after with the brawl ceasing and patrons dispersing. Cronin explained to friends how he had been punched on the right of his head and could be seen rubbing the area on CCTV. Cronin then left the hotel to stay at a friend's house and was complaining of a headache and feeling unwell during the rest of that evening.

By 12:30a.m., Cronin's condition had become considerably worse and was found vomiting in the bathroom by Hopkins to which Cronin said that he suspected he had a concussion. At around 1a.m., Cronin's mother, Robyn Cronin, was called to pick him up due to his poor condition. As his condition further deteriorated and Cronin began convulsing and suffered a seizure, an ambulance was called. By the time they arrived Cronin was unconscious.

MICA paramedics stabilised Cronin's condition for the journey to the hospital which in order to do so required medical intervention to assist Cronin in breathing. Upon his arrival to the Royal Melbourne Hospital, doctors determined that Cronin "suffered a significant haemorrhage on the right side of his brain" and that the "injury was not survivable".

Cronin died at 8:25p.m on 17 April 2016 from what was described as an "acute extra-dural haemorrhage following blunt force trauma." She described the area as the "achilles tendon of the skull." She determined that the punch Cronin suffered caused a  hairline fracture in his skull and it was a "lacerated artery that produced the haemorrhage."

Criminal proceedings 
It is believed that up to thirty people were involved in the brawl that ultimately took Cronin's life; several people were charged for their involvement in the brawl.

Andrew William Lee 
On 19 April 2016, Lee turned himself into police after they released an image of "a man they would like to speak to." On 20 April 2016, Lee was arrested, and charged with Cronin's murder.

In May 2017, Lee's initial charge of murder was downgraded to the lesser charge of manslaughter. On 8 September 2017, Lee pleaded guilty to one charge of manslaughter in relation to his involvement in the brawl. His plea of guilty occurred one day after his trial had started and a jury was empaneled.

In sentencing Lee, Justice Lex Lasry concluded that while the gravity of Lee's actions were significant, his plea of guilty which avoided a trial and the associated trauma to the Cronin family, his remorse for his actions, previous good character, and good prospects for rehabilitation all had contributed as factors that mitigated the sentence that was to be imposed.

On 10 November 2017, Lasry sentenced Lee to eight years' imprisonment, fixed with a five-year non-parole period, for the manslaughter of Patrick Cronin.

On two separate occasions, Lee's attempts to appeal against his sentence failed. On the first occasion, in March 2018, the matter was refused by a justice of the Court of Appeal. On the second occasion, in December 2018, the matter was refused by three Court of Appeal justices.

Other charges 
Aron John Burns, a man who had a prior criminal conviction for "intentionally causing injury", received a conviction and was fined $2,000 after pleading guilty to unlawfully fighting and affray.

Gerrard O'Connor had his charge dismissed after pleading not guilty claiming he was acting in self defence despite admitting to punching co-accused Samuel Judd in the face. Magistrate Lance Martin acquitted O'Connor after concluding that his actions were necessary in the course of protecting his friend who was also involved in the brawl.

Joseph Hitchcock, the man who was yelled at by four hotel patrons, was charged over his actions in the brawl which included criminal damage for breaking the phone of a person who was recording the incident and affray. Hitchcock pleaded guilty to both charges. Despite showing remorse and having no prior convictions, Hitchcock received a $4,000 fine and a criminal conviction.

Luke Sheahan, whose involvement in the fight lasted 12 seconds, and who pleaded guilty to affray received a 12-month good behaviour bond, and was ordered to donate $2,000 to the Pat Cronin Foundation.

Samuel Judd was charged in relation to the matter and was offered a diversion.

Simon Jeffrey Buchanan, a man who had no prior convictions, was offered a diversion, ordered to donate $2,000 to the Pat Cronin Foundation, and be of good behaviour after he pleaded guilty to unlawfully fighting and affray. He did not receive a criminal conviction.

Wayne Gilbert McManus, a man who had "two relevant prior convictions", was found guilty, received a $3,000 fine and a criminal conviction after pleading not guilty and claiming he "acted in defence of others" as he attempted to break up smaller fights within the brawl.

Pat Cronin Foundation 
Roughly two years after his death, Cronin's family launched a foundation in his honour to educate, raise awareness and conduct research in relation to the coward punch. The foundation has received hundreds of thousands of dollars in Victorian state government funding which was directed at the rollout of their 'Be Wise Education Program' across 200 schools. The program promotes wise decision making and the dangers of social violence to students with the ultimate goal being to end the coward punch. In addition to the presentations that are run throughout the year, the Foundation hosts events such as the 'Be Wise Ball' and the Be Wise Walk to the Valley where people walk from Heidelberg to Lower Plenty in memory of Cronin.

The foundation's symbol, the Be Wise Owl, was drawn by Cronin shortly before his passing and has since been used as a symbol for the Be Wise brand to promote the message of ending the coward punch.

Related matters 
In 2019, Lee was ordered to pay $170,972 in compensation to Cronin's family after they sought financial compensation for Lee's actions. In Victoria, all victims of crime are able to seek compensation from offenders through the Sentencing Act 1991, however, the process is costly, complex and lengthy.

In August 2018, it was revealed that Lee had been speaking to VCE legal studies students on excursions as they visited as part of a Corrections Victoria education program. While the program has been successfully run for twenty years, people were concerned that students were receiving talks from a man who killed a young person and that there was the potential for Lee to meet with someone who may have known Cronin. Following the furore, Lee was removed from the program.

Proposed law reforms 
Cronin's family has been vocal in their desire for new laws in dealing with coward punch cases, the impact on victims, and victims' families. This has included a call for crime compensation law reform. The current process for victims of crime to access compensation from an offender is very onerous, consumes a lot of time and money, and in the end the offender may decide to ignore the order which then requires the victim to persuade the matter in a civil lawsuit. Cronin's father has suggested that an order of compensation be imposed at the time of sentencing as an alternative. 

Legislation introduced in 2014 that imposed a ten-year mandatory minimum sentence for manslaughter as a result of a coward punch was unable to be applied in Lee's case after Justice Lasry determined that Lee's intention to strike Cronin could not be proven. As a result, Cronin's family has called for the current legislation to be reformed labelling it "poor and ambiguous" as the mandatory sentence is difficult to apply to manslaughter cases when manslaughter is typically murder without intent.

See also 
 Sucker punch
 Crime in Victoria
 Death of Thomas Kelly
 Rabbit punch

Reference list 

Australian victims of crime
1996 births
2016 deaths
2016 crimes in Australia
2010s in Sydney
April 2016 events in Australia
Deaths from bleeding
Deaths from head injury
Deaths by person in Australia
Crime in Melbourne
Crime victims from Melbourne